Nogometno društvo Gorica, commonly referred to as ND Gorica or simply Gorica, is a Slovenian football club based in the town of Nova Gorica. They are one of the most successful Slovenian clubs with four Slovenian PrvaLiga and three Slovenian Cup titles. The club plays its matches at the Nova Gorica Sports Park stadium with the capacity of 3,100 seats. As of the 2022–23 season, Gorica competes in the Slovenian PrvaLiga, the top tier of Slovenian football.

History

Yugoslav period (1947–1991)
The history of Slovenian association football in the Goriška region goes back to 1907, when the first football club Jugoslavija was formed by the Slovenes of Gorizia.

October 1947 marks the beginning of the club with the foundation of FD Gorica in Šempeter pri Gorici, where it operated until 1963. They started in the second-level but quickly promoted to the Slovenian Republic League in 1950 under the new name Železničar Nova Gorica. Five years later they became republic champions and qualified for the Yugoslav Second League, which was club's biggest achievement during the time of Yugoslavia. In 1963 the club merged with Branik Solkan and the club's activity was transferred to Nova Gorica, where it remains ever since. They stabilised as a mid-table club in the 1960s, renamed as NK Vozila in 1971 and achieved better results only in the last years before Slovenia's independence. Managed by Pavel Pinni, Vozila finished third in the 1988–89 season of the Slovenian Republic League.

Slovenian independence (1991 to present)
Following Slovenia's independence in 1991, the club played in the 1. SNL under the name HIT Gorica and during the 1995–96 season, Gorica won the Slovenian championship for the first time. In the next season, the club played its first Slovenian Supercup final and won their second trophy with a 3–1 victory over Olimpija. During the league domination of Maribor, the club managed to win two Slovenian cup titles in a row (2000–01 and 2001–02).

On the last day of the 2003–04 season on 30 May 2004, Gorica won its second title after one of the most dramatic rounds in the Slovenian league history. Before the last round, Maribor was leading the table with 54 points, one point ahead of Gorica. In the final round, Maribor played an away match against their rivals Mura and Gorica played at home against Koper. Maribor lost the game 2–1 after a second-half comeback by Mura, meaning that Gorica, who eventually won against Koper 2–0, had secured their second title.

The second title started an impressive run for Gorica as the team won another two league titles in a row (2004–05 and 2005–06). After the last title, Gorica was a runner-up in the 2006–07 and 2008–09 seasons, while finishing third in 2007–08 and 2009–10.

In 2013, Gorica started cooperating with the Italian club Parma. On 21 May 2014 they won their first trophy after eight years as they defeated Maribor 2–0 in the cup final. After 28 seasons in the top division, Gorica was relegated for the first time in the 2018–19 season after losing the relegation play-offs against Tabor Sežana.

Current squad

Honours
League
Slovenian First League
Winners (4): 1995–96, 2003–04, 2004–05, 2005–06
Runners-up (5): 1998–99, 1999–2000, 2006–07, 2008–09, 2016–17

Slovenian Second League
Winners: 2021–22

Cup
Slovenian Cup
Winners (3): 2000–01, 2001–02, 2013–14
Runners-up: 2004–05

Slovenian Supercup
Winners: 1996
Runners-up: 2014

Domestic league and cup results

*Best results are highlighted.

European record
All results (home and away) list Gorica's goal tally first.

Notes
 PR: Preliminary round
 Q: Qualifying round
 1Q: First qualifying round
 2Q: Second qualifying round
 3Q: Third qualifying round
 1R: First round
 2R: Second round

Notable managers
The following managers have won at least one trophy when in charge of Gorica since Slovenia's independence in 1991:

References

External links
Official website 
PrvaLiga profile 
Official UEFA profile
Soccerway profile

 
Association football clubs established in 1947
Football clubs in Slovenia
Football clubs in Yugoslavia
1947 establishments in Slovenia